Rogelio Barcenilla Jr. (born January 23, 1972, Bacolod, Philippines) is a Chess Grandmaster from Philippines.  He was the International Master (IM) in 1990 and Grandmaster in 2010. Barcenilla won the Asian Junior Chess Championship two times, back-to-back in 1989 held at Dubai, United Arab Emirates (UAE) and in 1990 at Kerala, India.

Barcenilla has played five times in Chess Olympics: 28th Chess Olympiad (1988), 30th Chess Olympiad (1992), 32nd Chess Olympiad (1996), 42nd Chess Olympiad (2016) and 2020 Online Chess Olympiad.

Notable Tournaments

References 

Living people
1972 births
Chess grandmasters
Filipino chess players